Alai is a breed of domesticated sheep found in Kyrgyzstan.  This breed is a dual purpose breed raised for its meat and wool.

Characteristics
Rams can be either horned or polled (hornless).  However, ewes are only polled.

The wool is white with occasional spots on their legs and heads. The wool is semi-coarse and used in carpet.

From 1992 to 2002, the population of Alai in Kyrgyzstan has decreased from 300,000 to 200,000.

References

Sheep breeds
Sheep breeds originating in Kyrgyzstan